Kemper Goodwin (April 28, 1906 – December 24, 1997) was a noted architect from Tempe, Arizona. He specialized in educational buildings. Some of his buildings are listed on the National Register of Historic Places in Arizona.

Life
Goodwin was born on April 28, 1906, in Tempe. He attended the University of Southern California, where he received training in architecture. He worked for Lescher & Mahoney and then Del Webb before starting his own firm. His firm was responsible for designing many of the buildings on the Tempe Campus of Arizona State University during the 1950s and 1960s. He designed more than 60 projects for the university which ranged from buildings of great importance to parking lots. He married Mary McGee (Mickey) and had three children; two sisters, MaryHelen and Kathleen, plus Michael, his son who would later go on to work with Kemper in designing important buildings. (Michael joined Kemper's firm in 1966.) Later in his career Kemper would go on to design several schools (many in collaboration with Michael) for the Tempe Union High School, Tempe Elementary, Kyrene, and Paradise Valley Unified School Districts. He retired in 1975 and died on December 24, 1997.

Major works
 Additions to the Arizona State Mental Hospital, Phoenix, 1930s (Superintendent for Lescher & Mahoney)
 Williams Air Force Base, Mesa, 1941 (Architectural coordinator for Del Webb)
 Kingman Gunnery School, Kingman, 1942 (Architect for Del Webb)
 The 1953 campus of Tempe High School, Tempe
 Ganado Elementary School, Ganado, 1952–1954
 Tovrea Land & Cattle Company Headquarters and Stockyards Restaurant, Phoenix, 1954
 Globe Junior High School, Globe, 1955
 Valley Presbyterian Church, Paradise Valley, 1960 (with Harold Wagnor)
 Additions to McKemy Middle School, Tempe, 1961
 Additions to Guadalupe School, 1960–1968, Guadalupe (now Frank Elementary School)
 Arizona Tuberculosis Sanitarium, Tempe, 1962–1963 (now ASU Community Services Building)
 Additions to Arizona Country Club, Phoenix, 1964
 McClintock High School, Tempe, 1964
 Laird Elementary School, Tempe, 1964
 Ganado Junior-Senior High School, Guando, 1962–1966
 Addition to Holbrook High School, Holbrook, 1965
 Evans Elementary School, Tempe, 1965 (with Michael Goodwin)
 Mesa Community College, Mesa, 1965-1966 (with Horlbeck-Hickman & Associates)
 Hudson Elementary School, Tempe, 1967 (with Michael Goodwin)
 Salt River Project Building, Tempe, 1966–1968 (with Michael Goodwin)
 Tempe Municipal Building, 1966–1970 (with Michael Goodwin) this upside-down pyramid was designed to shade and cool itself
 Marcos de Niza High School, Tempe, 1971 (with Michael Goodwin)
 Arizona Highway Employees Credit Union, Phoenix, 1971 (with Michael Goodwin)
 Arredondo Elementary School, Tempe, 1972 (with Michael Goodwin)
 Indian Bend Elementary School, Phoenix, 1972 (with Michael Goodwin)
 Desert Shadows Elementary School, Scottsdale, 1972 (with Michael Goodwin)

Arizona State University 
 Men's Gymnasium, 1927 (Superintendent for Lescher & Mahoney)
 West Hall, 1936 (Superintendent for Lescher & Mahoney)
 B. B. Moeur Activity Building, 1936 (Superintendent for Lescher & Mahoney)
 Home Management and Nursery Building, 1939–1940 (Superintendent for Lescher & Mahoney)
 Irish Hall, 1940 (Superintendent for Lescher & Mahoney)
 Goodwin Stadium, 1940–1941 (Superintendent for Lescher & Mahoney) (Demolished)
 Physical Education Building, 1951
 Maintenance Shop Building (later Undergraduate Academic Services Building) 1951 (Demolished)
 Renovation of Mathews Library, 1951
 Renovation of Old Main, 1954
 Infirmary, 1954 (Demolished)
 Memorial Union, 1954–1955
 Wilson Hall, 1956
 Swimming Pool, 1957
 Life Sciences Center, 1957-1959
 Bateman Physical Sciences Building 1957-1959 with expansions through 1968
 The Phi Sigma Kappa House (609 Alpha Drive, Tempe, Arizona) 1961 (demolished)
 Language & Literature Building, 1964
 Mathematics Building (now Wexler Hall) 1965–1968 (with Michael Goodwin)
 Central Boiler Plant (1967 with Michael Goodwin)

NRHP-listed structures
 Tempe Woman's Club, 1936
 Selleh House, 1940

References

Architects from Arizona
1906 births
1997 deaths
20th-century American architects